Electric Arguments is the third album by the Fireman. The album was first announced 29 September 2008, on Paul McCartney's website, and was released on 24 November 2008 on the duo's website. It is the first Fireman release to be publicly acknowledged by McCartney, and the album cover features the names of both contributors in contrast to the anonymity of earlier works.

Background and recording
Unlike the earlier Fireman albums, Electric Arguments features prominent vocals. Each of the songs was recorded in one day, the album itself being completed in only 13 days, spread over the course of nearly a year. The album includes the hidden track "Road Trip", at the end of "Don't Stop Running". Remixes of "Lifelong Passion" were made, titled "Sawain Ambient Acapella" and "Sawain Instrumental Dub". Instrumental mixes of "Sun Is Shining" and "Traveling Light" were made, titled "Equinox Instrumental" and "Travelling Light Instrumental", respectively. Instrumental dub mixes were made of "Sing the Changes" and "Don't Stop Running", titled "Morning Mist Instrumental Dub" and "Wickerman Ambient Dub", respectively.

The duo borrowed the title "Electric Arguments" from the poem "Kansas City to St. Louis" by Allen Ginsberg. McCartney stated this was because "he's been looking at the beauty of word combinations rather than their meaning." He also said of his collaboration with Youth:
We had a ball making this album, and it was a great departure because it seemed more like improv theatre. In the improv spirit, there are William Burroughs-type cut-ups in the lyrics. I came to "Sing the Changes," as well as all the other songs in the album, with absolutely no concept of what the melody or lyrics would be about. So it was like writing on the spot, which I think lent an electricity to the whole sound.

Release
An edited version of "Nothing Too Much Out of Sight" premiered on BBC Radio 1 on 29 September 2008. "Lifelong Passion" was available briefly as a charity download for Adopt-A-Minefield.

Electric Arguments debuted at number 79 on the UK Album Charts, marking the first appearance for the Fireman in the British charts. The duo also made their inaugural appearance on the Billboard 200, peaking at number 67.

Critical reception

According to reviews aggregator Metacritic, the album rated 74 out of 100, indicating a "generally favourable" critical reception, based on 23 reviews (18 of which were positive, four mixed, and one negative). AllMusic's Stephen Thomas Erlewine wrote that "There are more twists and turns, more textures, than on any other McCartney album in the last 20 years …" Will Hermes of Rolling Stone called the album "the ex-Beatle's headiest music in years". In a four-star review for The Times, Pete Paphides wrote that "Electric Arguments is delivered with a disregard for production values or playlist potential that would make, say, Keane or the Kooks blush at their own conservatism".

Less impressed, Alex Macpherson of The Guardian described the album as "heavily laboured hackwork". He said of the track "Nothing Too Much Just Out of Sight": "This has been pegged by the more excitable tabloids as a hate rant against [McCartney's ex-wife] Heather Mills, but if this is what she has had to put up with, it may just have done the unthinkable and engendered sympathy for the poor woman." Ron Hart of PopMatters rated Electric Arguments 7 out of 10 and considered that the project's appeal "depends on where you stand as a Macca fan", following the singer's run of strong studio albums since Driving Rain in 2001. After opining that these nominal McCartney albums were "much stronger releases on almost every level", Hart concluded: "Electric Arguments does harbor its own unique charm that will certainly appeal to longtime fans [more] than Macca's previous pair of Fireman jaunts."

Track listing
All songs written by Paul McCartney.

 "Nothing Too Much Just Out of Sight" – 4:55
 "Two Magpies" – 2:12
 "Sing the Changes" – 3:44
 "Travelling Light" – 5:06
 "Highway" – 4:17
 "Light from Your Lighthouse" (Traditional)– 2:31
 "Sun Is Shining" – 5:12
 "Dance 'Til We're High" – 3:37
 "Lifelong Passion" – 4:49
 "Is This Love?" – 5:52
 "Lovers in a Dream" – 5:22
 "Universal Here, Everlasting Now" – 5:05
 "Don't Stop Running" ("Don't Stop Running" ends at 5:59, followed by 1:53 of silence and a hidden track titled "Road Trip") – 10:31

iTunes bonus track
 "Sawain Ambient Acapella" – 4:53

Reissues
Electric Arguments has been reissued in several packages:

Digital Only download; the original 13-track album as a download
CD and digital 1 CD and download; the original 13-track album as a CD and download
Vinyl, CD and digital 2 LPs, 1 CD and download; the original 13-track album as an LP, CD and download. On the two LPs, tracks 1-4 are side one, 5-8 are side two, 9-11 are side three, and 12-13 are side four. Unusual for an LP, the last track, "Don't Stop Running", includes the hidden track, "Road Trip", with silence separating the tracks.
Deluxe edition (2009) 2 LPs, 2 CDs, 2 DVDs and download; a tin box set containing: the original 13-track album as an LP, CD and download. 7-track CD containing bonus mixes and alternate versions, DVD of hi-definition audio recordings, DVD of multi-track session files, 2 exclusive art prints, and extensive booklet

Disc 1 The original album
The original 13-track album.

Disc 2 bonus tracks
 "Solstice Ambient Acapella" – 15:11
 "Travelling Light Instrumental" – 8:16
 "Wickerman Ambient Dub" – 12:41
 "Morning Mist Instrumental Dub" – 5:40
 "Equinox Instrumental" – 8:22
 "Sawain Ambient Acapella" – 4:51
 "Sawain Instrumental Dub" – 4:51

Disc 3 DVD – Hi-definition audio recordings
 "Sing the Changes" (music video) – 3:52
 "Dance 'til We're High" (music video) – 3:40
 "In the Studio" (documentary) – 12:41

Disc 4 DVD – Multi-track session files
 "Dance 'til We're High"
 "Highway"
 "Light from Your Lighthouse"
 "Sing the Changes"
 "Sun Is Shining"

Personnel
 Paul McCartney – all instruments and vocals

References

External links
Paul McCartney – Fireman – official album website (in June 2018 this link leads to McCartney's lawyers, without music content)
Paul McCartney Q&A: Behind the Fireman's New Psych-Pop Gem (Rolling Stone interview)

The Fireman (band) albums
2008 albums
Albums produced by Paul McCartney
One Little Independent Records albums
Albums produced by Youth (musician)
ATO Records albums
Experimental pop albums